Joseph A. Montalbano (born November 23, 1954) is an Associate Justice on the Rhode Island Superior Court.

Political career 
Montalbano served as Democratic member of the Rhode Island Senate, representing the 37th District from 1988 to 2002, when the Senate was downsized from 50 to 38 members in 2002. Montalbano then represented the 17th district until he was he was defeated in 2008 by Independent Edward O'Neill. He served as the President of the Senate from 2003 to 2009, and was Majority Leader from 2002 through 2003. In 2013, Governor Lincoln Chafee nominated Montalbano to serve as Associate Justice on the Rhode Island Superior Court in the seat vacated by Justice Francis Darigan Jr. Montalbano has served in the position since June 2013. Montalbano is the first former state senator to become a Superior Court judge since 1994.

Controversies 
In 2007, Montalbano was fined $12,000 by the Rhode Island Ethics Commission for failing to disclose a potential conflict of interest. While acting as a private attorney for the town of West Warwick, Montalbano, in his role as a state senator, voted on issues pertaining to the development of a Narraganset-owned casino within the town. Montalbano dismissed the wrongdoing as  inadvertent.

Personal life 
Montalbano attended St. John's University in New York and received his bachelor's degree from the University of Pennsylvania. He has taught constitutional and criminal law at the Community College of Rhode Island.

References

External links 
Rhode Island Senate - Senator Joseph A. Montalbano at official RI Senate website
Project Vote Smart - Senator Joseph A. Montalbano (RI) profile
Follow the Money - Joseph A. Montalbano
2006 2004 2002 2000 1998 1996 1994 campaign contributions
  (Joseph A. Montalbano... Corruption and Collusion between the RI Senate and Judiciary)

Rhode Island state senators
1954 births
Living people
Politicians from Providence, Rhode Island
Presidents of the Rhode Island State Senate
Missing middle or first names
Superior court judges in the United States